Khristo Stefanov (born 21 December 1970) is a Bulgarian former long-distance runner. In April 1996 he won the Hannover Marathon in Germany in 2:12.25 and was named on the Olympic team for that event. He competed in the men's marathon at the 1996 Summer Olympics where he finished 30th in 2:18.29.  His personal best time for the marathon distance is 2:11.26

References

External links
 

1970 births
Living people
Athletes (track and field) at the 1996 Summer Olympics
Bulgarian male long-distance runners
Bulgarian male marathon runners
Olympic athletes of Bulgaria
Place of birth missing (living people)
Bulgarian male cross country runners
People from Botevgrad
Sportspeople from Sofia Province
21st-century Bulgarian people
20th-century Bulgarian people